Michael Skinner (1941 1998) was an American magician known for his close-up magic work. He was born in Rochester, New York in 1941; but he spent most of his professional life living and working in Las Vegas, Nevada. Skinner worked for over 20 years as the magician-in-residence at the Golden Nugget, but he also made appearances in other venues. He also performed twice on The Tonight Show Starring Johnny Carson.

Skinner was known for his large repertoire. He was reported to have once performed 28 consecutive shows without the repetition of a single trick during a full week of bookings at the Magic Castle.

Skinner studied under magicians Eddie Fechter and Dai Vernon.

References

1941 births
1998 deaths
American magicians
People from Rochester, New York
Academy of Magical Arts Close-Up Magician of the Year winners
Academy of Magical Arts Performing Fellowship winners